Salyan may refer to:

Places

Azerbaijan 
Salyan District (Azerbaijan), a district of Azerbaijan
Salyan, Azerbaijan, capital of the Salyan rayon (district)
Shirvan-Salyan economic region, an economic region of Azerbaijan

Nepal 
Salyan District, Nepal, a district of Nepal
Salyan Khalanga, the headquarters of Salyan District
Salyan, Baglung, a village development committee
Salyan, Kaski, a town and village development committee
Salyan, Solukhumbu, a village development committee 
Salyan 1 (constituency), Nepali parliamentary constituency

Russia
Salyan, Republic of Dagestan

Sports
FK Mughan Salyan, Azerbaijani football team
Plastik Salyan FK, Azerbaijani football team
Salyan Olympic Sport Complex Stadium, Azerbaijani sport complex